Ain Merane is a town and commune in Chlef Province, Algeria. According to the 2008 census it has a population of 51,326.

References

Communes of Chlef Province